Collor (possibly from Quechua quyllur, star) is an archaeological site in Peru. It is situated in the Cajamarca Region, Cajamarca Province, Namora District.

References 

Archaeological sites in Peru
Archaeological sites in Cajamarca Region
Mountains of Peru